Gabriel Anton Walter (5 February 1752 – 11 April 1826) was a builder of pianos. The Grove Dictionary of Music and Musicians describes him as "the most famous Viennese piano maker of his time".

Life
Walter was born in Neuhausen auf den Fildern, Germany. The record of his marriage to a widow named Anna Elisabeth Schöffstoss in 1780 indicates that he had moved to Vienna by that time. His earlier surviving pianos are dated to this year.

His piano business was evidently successful. In 1790 he was awarded the status of Imperial Royal Chamber Organ Builder and Instrument Maker. By 1800 he was employing about 20 workmen. In that year he was joined in the firm by his stepson Joseph Schöffstoss, and the pianos came to be labeled "Anton Walter und Sohn" ("and son"). The last surviving Walter piano is dated 1825, and he died the following year.

Walter's pianos

Walter's instruments are classified within the so-called "Viennese" school of piano design. This school originated with Johann Andreas Stein, who built pianos in Augsburg. In Viennese instruments, the head of the hammer is closer to the player than the hinge, and the hammer is made to rise when its short opposite end is caught on a hook. Like all early pianos, those of the Viennese school were of far lighter construction than modern instruments and had a quite distinct sound; for general discussion, see fortepiano.

Walter improved on Stein's design by adding to the action a back check, which caught the hammer on its descent, preventing it from bouncing up and down in lively playing. This innovation was generally adopted by other Viennese makers in Walter's time, and remains standard in the modern piano. Its importance is illustrated by an observation of Palmieri and Palmieri, namely that modern replicas of Stein pianos commonly include a back check even though it is not historically authentic on these instruments.

Walter's career extended over several decades, and his instruments evolved with the times, with ever heavier construction as the piano began its shift from the lightweight Classical-era norm toward its far heavier modern incarnation, achieved by about 1870.  He died in Vienna, aged 74.

Mozart's instrument

Wolfgang Amadeus Mozart bought a Walter piano in about 1782, and employed it in one of the most important phases of his career, the composition and highly successful premieres of his mature piano concertos (see: Mozart piano concertos). In about 1800 (nine years after Mozart's death), this instrument was apparently considerably modified by the Walter firm. It survives today (and is kept in Salzburg, previously having been the property of Mozart's son Carl in Milan), but cannot provide reliable testimony for Mozart's own performance practice due to Walter's modifications: the type of hammer mechanism appears to have been changed and furthermore when Mozart owned the piano there may only have been hand operated levers for the dampers. A Walter instrument in Nuremberg, inv. MIR 1098, dated ca. 1790 by Latcham, uses hand operated levers. Contemporary and earlier instruments by Johann Andreas Stein, liked and played by Mozart, do have the knee levers for the dampers.

Surviving Walter pianos
The following list is not complete. For more on Walter and his pianos, see the relevant chapter in: Michael Latcham, Pianos for Haydn, Mozart and Beethoven: change and contrast, published by Katzbichler, Munich and Salzburg, 2017
  – Burgenländische Landesmuseum, Eisenstadt, Austria
  – The Mozart instrument, now kept in the composer's birth home in Salzburg
1789 – Musical Instrument Museum in Poznań, Poland (part of the collection of National Museum in Poznań)
  – Germanisches Nationalmuseum, Nuremberg (mentioned above in discussion of hand stops). The instrument is veneered in walnut. The museum owns two other pianos by Walter and one by Walter & Son.
  – Rector's Palace, Dubrovnik
  – Villa Cicogna Mozzoni, Italy
  – Richard Burnett Collection, formerly Finchcocks collection, Tunbridge Wells, England. A small portable square piano by Walter & Sohn. Each note has but one string, in contrast to the usual two or three used in most pianos even in Walter's day. The range is C–f3. Kottick and Lucktenberg describe its tone as having a "bell-like quality that never fails to charm."
  – Musikinstrumenten-Museum, Berlin, Walter & Sohn
  – Württembergisches Landesmuseum, Stuttgart. This instrument has a 6½ half octave range, an octave and a half more than the standard (F–f) of Mozart's day. It is decorated with "gilded caryatids and grillework and medallions in brass."
1820–1830 – National Museum, Prague. A six-pedal piano described by Kottick and Lucktenberg as "eye-catching ... an elegant and harmonious example of the finest piano making of the time."

Walter's pianos as models for modern builders

In modern times, fortepianos have been constructed by a number of builders for purposes of historically informed performance of 18th century and early 19th century music. For this purpose Walter's instruments have been important, serving as the model for instruments constructed by Philip Belt, Chris Maene, Paul McNulty, Paul Poletti, and Rodney Regier, among others.

Recordings made with originals and replicas of Walter's pianos 

 Paul Badura-Skoda. Wolfgang Amadeus Mozart. Works for piano. Played on an Anton Walter 1790 fortepiano. Label: Gramola
 Paul Badura-Skoda with Musica Florea. Wolfgang Amadeus Mozart. Piano concertos K.271, K.414. Played on a replica of a Walter instrument made by Paul McNulty
 Malcolm Bilson, John Eliot Gardiner, The English Baroque Soloists. Wolfgang Amadeus Mozart. Piano Concertos Nos. 20&21/ Concertos Pour Piano K. 466 & K.467. Played on a replica of Walter fortepiano by Philip Belt. Label: Archiv Production
 Kristian Bezuidenhout. Wolfgang Amadeus Mozart. Keyboard Music Vol.2 Played on a replica of a Walter instrument made by Paul McNulty. 
 Robert Levin with the Academy of Ancient Music, Christopher Hogwood. Wolfgang Amadeus Mozart. Piano Concertos Nos. 15 & 26. Played on Mozart’s own Walter (restored)
 Andreas Staier. Joseph Haydn. Sonatas and Variations. Played on a replica of a Walter instrument made by Christopher Clarke

 Viviana Sofronitsky with Warsaw Chamber Opera Orchestra. Wolfgang Amadeus Mozart. Complete Mozart works for keyboard instrument and orchestra (11 CD box). Played on a replica of a Walter instrument made by Paul McNulty

References
Notes

Sources
Kottick, Edward and George Lucktenberg (1997) Early Keyboard Instruments in European Museums. Bloomington: Indiana University Press.
Latcham, Michael (1997) "Mozart and the pianos of Gabriel Anton Walter." Early Music 25(3):383–400.
Latcham, Michael (2009) "Anton Walter". Article in the Grove Dictionary of Music and Musicians, online edition. Oxford University Press.
Palmieri, Robert and Margaret W. Palmieri (2003) Piano: An Encyclopedia. Taylor & Francis. .

Further reading
Badura-Skoda, Eva (2000) "The Anton Walter fortepiano—Mozart's beloved concert instrument: A response to Michael Latcham." Early Music 28(3):469–473.
Steblin, Rita (2007), "Anton Walter's Difficult Early Years in Vienna: New Documents, 1772–1779" Journal of the American Musical Instrument Society; vol. 33. 2007, 41–75
 John A. Rice, "Anton Walter, Instrument Maker to Leopold II"

External links 

 Fortepianos after Anton Walter; includes sound files of three of Gerard Tuinman's replicas of Walter pianos
 Fortepiano Anton Walter (1795), replica by Chris Maene
 Fortepiano Anton Walter (1795); The Min-On Music Museum in Tokyo
 Fortepiano by Anton Walter (1792) replica by Paul McNulty
 Fortepiano by Anton Walter & Sohn (1805) replica by Paul McNulty
Haydnhaus in Eisenstadt. Anton Walter’s piano

1752 births
1826 deaths
18th-century Austrian people
19th-century Austrian people
Piano makers
People from Esslingen (district)
People from the Duchy of Württemberg
German emigrants to Austria
Musicians from Vienna